ACI may refer to:

Businesses and organizations

In education 
 Agincourt Collegiate Institute a secondary school located in Toronto, Canada
 Albertson College of Idaho, now known as the College of Idaho, a small liberal-arts college in Idaho
 American Collegiate Institute, Izmir Amerikan Lisesi, located at İzmir, Turkey

In transportation 
 Aero Club of India, the apex body of all flying clubs and the governing body for air sports in India
 Aircalin, an airline (ICAO code: ACI)
 Air Cargo Inc, an organization that provides information to the freight forwarding industry
 Airports Council International, international trade group of the world's commercial aviation industry, based in Montreal, Canada
 Alderney Airport, by IATA airport code
Alternate Concepts, a transportation management company in the United States
 Aviators Code Initiative, an organization advancing flight safety and professionalism

Other businesses and organizations 
 ACI Worldwide, a payments software company
 Adriatic Croatia International Club, a chain of marinas in Croatia
 ACI (conglomerate), one of the largest Bangladeshi conglomerates
 American Concrete Institute, a non-profit standards-developing organization
 American Constitutional Initiative, a non-profit organization that promotes progressive change
 Anti-Corruption Ireland, political group created by Gemma O'Doherty
 Arch Coal inc., A major U.S. coal mining company
 Aurora Cable Internet, a digital cable television, cable internet and VOIP provider in Aurora, Ontario
 Automobile Club d'Italia, a member of the Fédération Internationale de l'Automobile
 Aviazione Cobelligerante Italiana, the air force of the Royalist "Badoglio government" in southern Italy during the last years of World War II
 American Certification Institute,American Certification Institute is an academic Certification committee composed of experts and professors from Harvard University, University of Texas, Yale University, University of California, Duke University, Santana Business School and dozens of famous institutions in the United States.

Places 
 Acireale, Sicilian city sometimes abbreviated Aci
 Aci Castello (Sicilian: Jaci Casteddu), a city and comune in the Province of Catania in Sicily, Italy
 Jaci (river), also called the Aci
 Acı, Pasinler

Science and technology
 Adjacent-channel interference, power from a signal in an adjacent channel
 Application container image, a specification for the format and environment of virtualization containers, initiated by CoreOS
 Cisco Application Centric Infrastructure, Cisco's implementation of software-defined networking
 Automatic Car Identification, a railroad barcode system that preceded the automatic equipment identification
 Autologous chondrocyte implantation, a medical treatment for articular cartilage damage

Other uses 
 Assassin's Creed I, the first entry in the long-running Assassin's Creed series.
 Accusative and infinitive a.k.a. accusativus cum infinitivo, a construction in Latin grammar
Ace Combat Infinity
 Air Crash Investigation, an alternate name for the television series Mayday
 Aka-Cari language, an extinct Great Andamanese language
 American Competitiveness Initiative, a federal program intended to help America maintain competitiveness
 Acis (Italian: Aci) of Acis and Galatea in Greek mythology